Minuscule 283 (in the Gregory-Aland numbering), ε 373 (Soden), is a Greek minuscule manuscript of the New Testament, on parchment. Palaeographically it has been assigned to the 13th century. 
It has marginalia.

Description 

The codex contains the text of the four Gospels on 159 parchment leaves, with lacunae (Matthew 8:2-13:10; 19:7-21:2; 23:16-24:33; John 18:11-36). The text is written in one column per page, in 31-33 lines per page. The lacking parts of the manuscript were supplied in the 16th century on paper.

Text 

The Greek text of the codex is a representative of the Byzantine text-type. Hermann von Soden included it to the textual family Kx. Aland placed it in Category V.

According to the Claremont Profile Method it represents textual family Kx in Luke 20. In Luke 1 it has a mixture of the Byzantine text-families. In Luke 10 no profile was made.

History 

The manuscript was added to the list of New Testament manuscripts by Scholz (1794-1852). 
It was examined and described by Paulin Martin.

The manuscript is currently housed at the Bibliothèque nationale de France (Gr. 92) at Paris.

See also 

 List of New Testament minuscules
 Biblical manuscript
 Textual criticism

References

Further reading 

 Jean-Pierre-Paul Martin, Description technique des manuscrits grecs, relatif au Nouveau Testament, conservé dans les bibliothèques des Paris (Paris 1883), p. 69

Greek New Testament minuscules
13th-century biblical manuscripts
Bibliothèque nationale de France collections